| top scorer =
| most tries =
| website    = Asia Rugby
| preceded by = 2017
| succeeded by = 2023
}}

The 2022 Asia Rugby Women's Championship is the 11th edition of the Asia Rugby Women's Championship following the cancellation of the 2021 edition due to COVID-19 related restrictions. Hong Kong hosted Kazakhstan on a 2 match series for the title.

Standings

Results

References 

2022 in Asian rugby union
2022 in women's rugby union
Asia Rugby Women's Championship
Rugby union in Hong Kong
Rugby union in Kazakhstan
Asia Rugby
Asia Rugby Women's Championship